Listen, Mom and Dad (1977) is a non-fiction book on child-rearing by author Orson Scott Card. This was Card's first published book.

See also
List of works by Orson Scott Card
Orson Scott Card

External links
 The official Orson Scott Card website

1977 non-fiction books
Books by Orson Scott Card
Parenting advice books